"Miracle" is a song by Scottish DJ and record producer Calvin Harris and English singer and songwriter Ellie Goulding. It was released on 10 March 2023 through Sony. The song marks their third collaboration, following "I Need Your Love" (2013) and "Outside" (2014).

Background
On 12 January 2023, Harris posted a picture of him and Goulding together in a recording studio. On 5 February, the former shared a clip of editing Goulding's harmonies on the song. Goulding first performed parts of the song acapella inside St Bartholomew-the-Great which was uploaded on TikTok by both artists.

The song is their first collaboration in nearly ten years. According to Harris, creating the song took him back to his early producing days in the late 1990s, having taking "bits from that" and putting it "in a new context". To top it all off, he chose Goulding as the vocalist, citing her "angelic voice" and calling her the only one capable to deliver the vocals on the song.

Composition
Described as a trance song, it sees the duo returning to "the trance rave heyday", featuring a "throbbing, Eurodance drum beat" combined with "ethereal piano and glittering synths" on the production. Katie Bain of Billboard thought the track was reminiscent of "Children" (1995) by Robert Miles. The song was noted for being way different compared to their previous collaborations, hailing back to the "glory days of electronic music" of the 1990s.

Charts

References

2023 singles
2023 songs
Calvin Harris songs
Ellie Goulding songs
Songs written by Burns (musician)
Songs written by Calvin Harris
Songs written by Ellie Goulding
Trance songs